ARY Digital HD is a Pakistani pay television network available in Pakistan, the Middle East, North America and Europe. The ARY Group of companies is a Dubai-based holding company founded by a Pakistani businessman, Abdul Razzak Yaqoob (ARY). The network is focused towards only Pakistani diaspora. The channel has an expanding network of channels, each with an independent focus.

The channel broadcasts on cable and satellite networks, linear television as well as streaming platforms including YouTube Channel and ARY ZAP.

History
ARY Digital, formerly known as The Pakistani Channel, was launched in the United Kingdom in 16th September 2000 to cater to the Pakistani community living in the region. It uses Samacom, an uplink provider based in the UAE, as the uplink teleport station. The channel started off with a format similar to PTV Prime and other South Asian channels where it provided slots for soap operas in general while presenting an hourly slot for news headlines. Although flaming political talk shows and dramas were the main priority when it came to programming, the network soon was hailed for its news coverage.

The network acquired a license to start broadcasting in Pakistan.

In 2002, the ARY Star Gold Quiz Show became the first live show to offer a prize of one kilogram of gold. For the period of its broadcast, participants won over 260 kilograms of gold. In 2005, the network obtained the rights to show Live 8 on its sister music channel, The Musik. The channel also held rights to the Who Wants to be a Millionaire franchise for Pakistan.

On 18 October 2007 most of the ARY news team, covering former Prime Minister Benazir Bhutto's arrival from exile, were killed by one of two explosions. Pictures of the victims were shown live on the news hour and prayers were observed. Bhutto was later escorted safely to an official government house.

SD Feed Closure
Since July 2021, ARY Digital has been only available in high-definition. The standard definition (SD) broadcast was shutdown 15 August 2021.

Specialized programming
By 2004, ARY Digital had started up three sister ventures apart from the flagship channel ARY Digital, channels targeting generalized programming. They include ARY News, a news channel; ARY Musik, a youth-oriented music channel, and ARY Qtv, an Islamic network.

Availability

Continental programming
In 2004, ARY Digital divided its broadcasts in such a way, that each continent had different programming at different times, to better facilitate the audience. The channels were split as follows:
ARY Digital Asia
ARY Digital UAE
ARY Digital UK
ARY Digital USA

ARY Digital Asia
The Asian feed of the channel is free-to-air, as channels in the South Asia are usually broadcast without encryption. Unlike other feeds, ARY Digital Asia features a wider variety of local programmes and international shows. Many of which may include foreign programmes including Hollywood, Bollywood and Lollywood movies, American & British TV shows, for example Criminal Minds, 24, Criminal Minds: Beyond Boundaries, NCIS, Prison Break & Fear Factor: Khatron Ke Khiladi

ARY Digital UAE
It is a free-to-air channel broadcasting at the Pakistani diaspora in the United Arab Emirates. Its programming is limited to Pakistani-produced shows only.

Current programmes

Criticism
In 2003, ARY Digital was criticised upon its airing of a prisoner's derogatory comments against the Anti-Terrorism Court (ATC-3) and a video showing balded young girls behind bars begging for mercy. The contempt of court proceedings against the officials of the network were withdrawn after the judge accepted unconditional apologies.

See also 
 ARY Films
 List of Pakistani television series
 Television in Pakistan

References

External links

 
Mass media companies of the United Arab Emirates
Television networks in Pakistan
Television channels and stations established in 2000
Television channels in the United Kingdom
Foreign-language television stations in the United States
Television stations in Karachi
Urdu-language television channels
Urdu-language television channels in the United Kingdom
Urdu-language television stations in the United States